Colony High School (CHS) is a public secondary school in Palmer, Alaska, United States, serving students in grades 9–12. It is part of the Matanuska-Susitna Borough School District. Colony High School's rivals include Wasilla High School and Palmer High School.

Sports
Colony's sports include football, cross-country running, swimming, tennis, cross-country skiing, wrestling, hockey, basketball, track and field, soccer, baseball, volleyball, and softball.

Activities
Colony High School had the state's only marching band for 15 years until 2017, when one other school in the area started a band. The following season, three other schools also started bands and four of the five participated in the 2018 Invitational hosted annually by Colony. The marching band was invited to march at the 2009 Inaugural Parade for Barack Obama. It participated in the 2014 Tournament of Roses Parade on January 1, 2014 in Pasadena, CA, and the 2017 Macy's Thanksgiving Day Parade.

The school produces its own newspaper, entitled The Knightly News.

Notable people
 Clare Baldwin, journalist.
 Jessica Moore (basketball), basketball player.
 Cole Magner, indoor football wide receiver.

References

External links
https://web.archive.org/web/20081007053022/http://schools.publicschoolsreport.com/Alaska/Palmer/ColonyHighSchool.html

Public high schools in Alaska
Schools in Matanuska-Susitna Borough, Alaska